Volodymyr Vasyutyk (born 24 March 1970) is a former Soviet and Ukrainian football goalkeeper and Ukrainian coach.

In 2021 FC Uzhhorod managed by Vasiutyk gained promotion to the First League (tier 2).

References

External links
 

1970 births
Living people
Sportspeople from Uzhhorod
Soviet footballers
Ukrainian footballers
FC Hoverla Uzhhorod players
FC Shakhtar Donetsk players
FC Zirka Kropyvnytskyi players
FC Papirnyk Malyn players
Soviet Top League players
Ukrainian Premier League players
Kazakhstan Premier League players
Association football goalkeepers
Ukrainian football managers
FC Hoverla Uzhhorod managers
FC Uzhhorod managers